S.U.S.A.R. is the first full-length album by the band Indukti. The album was released by OFF Music on September 20, 2004, and was re-released by The Laser's Edge on September 6, 2005. On November 17, 2013, Sunspot Records released S.U.S.A.R for the first time on 180g vinyl. The LP was cut at half-speed by Stan Ricker. The title abbreviation comes from medicine and means "Suspected Unexpected Serious Adverse Reaction"

The album is partly inspired by the film Metropolis by Fritz Lang.

Track listing
 "Freder" – (7:30)
 "Cold Inside...I" – (4:06)
 "No. 11812" – (8:00)
 "Shade" – (4:29)
 "Uluru" – (6:34)
 "No. 11811" – (7:25)
 "...and Weak II" – (9:37)
 "Mantra" (bonus track - only on USA CD and Vinyl edition)

Personnel
 Maciej Jaśkiewicz – guitar
 Ewa Jabłońska – violin
 Wawrzyniec Dramowicz – drums
 Maciej Adamczyk – bass guitar
 Piotr Kocimski – guitar, saz, didgeridoo

Guest musicians
 Mariusz Duda – vocals
 Anna Faber – harp

References

External links
 

2004 debut albums
Indukti albums
Works based on Metropolis (1927 film)